Saingkyu is a village in Homalin Township, Hkamti District, in the Sagaing Region of northwestern Burma.

References

External links
Maplandia World Gazetteer

Populated places in Hkamti District
Homalin Township